{{DISPLAYTITLE:C22H31N3O3}}
The molecular formula C22H31N3O3 may refer to:

 BMY-7378, a 5-HT1A receptor weak partial agonist/antagonist and α1D-adrenergic receptor antagonist
 MDMB-CHMINACA, an indazole-based synthetic cannabinoid